Jamil Muhammad Ismail al-Majdalawi (born 1946) is a leading member of the Popular Front for the Liberation of Palestine, and a member of the Palestinian Legislative Council.

Born in Simsim, he is one of the PFLP's two representatives on the PLO CC, and the head of their Political Office based in Gaza.  He was one of their three deputies elected to the PLC in 2006.

References

External links
interview  from 2001

Living people
1946 births
Popular Front for the Liberation of Palestine members
People from the Gaza Strip
Members of the 2006 Palestinian Legislative Council